Andrija Dragojević (Serbian Cyrillic: Андрија Драгојевић; born 25 December 1991) is a Montenegrin goalkeeper who  currently plays for Montenegrin side FK Dečić.

Club career
Born in Titograd, he played in the youth team of OFK Beograd before making his debut as senior playing on loan with Dinamo Vranje in 2010–11 Serbian First League. He then switched to play in same league but on loan at OFK Mladenovac and then with Montenegrin First League side Lovćen. He made 3 appearances with OFK Beograd first-team in the first half of the 2012–13 Serbian SuperLiga. During the winter break of the 2013–14 season he left OFK Beograd and joined Lovćen permanently.

On 13 February 2014, Dragojević signed a one and a half year contract with Velež Mostar playing in the Bosnian Premier League. On 30 August 2015, Dragojević moved clubs again but this time to Albanian Superliga club Vllaznia Shkodër.

On 14 February 2018, Dragojević signed for Armenian Premier League club FC Alashkert. On 1 March Alashkert announced that Dragojević had moved to fellow Armenian Premier League club Ararat Yerevan on loan for the remainder of the season.

On 24 June 2018, FC Pyunik announced the signing of Dragojević. On 5 August 2020, Dragojević left Pyunik by mutual consent.

International career
On the national team level, Dragojević represented Montenegro at U-19 level.

Honours
Lovćen
Montenegrin Cup: 2013–14

References

External links
 Profile at OFK Beograd official website
 
 Profile at Soccerfame
 Stats at Utakmica.rs

1991 births
Living people
Footballers from Podgorica
Association football goalkeepers
Montenegrin footballers
Montenegro youth international footballers
FK Dinamo Vranje players
OFK Beograd players
OFK Mladenovac players
FK Lovćen players
FK Velež Mostar players
KF Vllaznia Shkodër players
Karmiotissa FC players
OFK Grbalj players
FC Ararat Yerevan players
FC Pyunik players
Serbian First League players
Serbian SuperLiga players
Montenegrin First League players
Premier League of Bosnia and Herzegovina players
Kategoria Superiore players
Cypriot First Division players
Armenian Premier League players
Montenegrin expatriate footballers
Expatriate footballers in Serbia
Montenegrin expatriate sportspeople in Serbia
Expatriate footballers in Bosnia and Herzegovina
Montenegrin expatriate sportspeople in Bosnia and Herzegovina
Expatriate footballers in Albania
Montenegrin expatriate sportspeople in Albania
Expatriate footballers in Cyprus
Montenegrin expatriate sportspeople in Cyprus
Expatriate footballers in Armenia
Montenegrin expatriate sportspeople in Armenia